Kevin Bosse Elie Beugré (born 23 August 1992) is an Ivorian footballer who plays as a striker for Hønefoss BK.

Club career
Beugré was born in Adzope. He made his debut for Hønefoss on 7 November 2010 in the 6–1 defeat over Sandefjord. He scored his two first goals for Hønefoss in the 3–2 victory against Bodø/Glimt on 13 June 2011. He scored his first hat-trick for Hønefoss in the 5–3 victory against Nybergsund on 16 June 2011. In August 2013, Beugré was sent on loan to the First Division side Mjøndalen to play more regularly.

After spending 2017 in HamKam, he joined Fram Larvik ahead of the 2018 season, but as that club was threatened financially he moved on to Egersund. He left Egersund again at the end of 2018.

On 25 March 2021, he returned to his former club Hønefoss in the Norwegian Third Division.

Career statistics

Notes

References

External links

1992 births
Living people
Ivorian footballers
Ivorian expatriate footballers
Association football forwards
Hønefoss BK players
Mjøndalen IF players
Hamarkameratene players
Egersunds IK players
IF Fram Larvik players
FC San-Pédro players
Eliteserien players
Norwegian First Division players
Norwegian Second Division players
Norwegian Third Division players
People from Adzopé
Ivorian expatriate sportspeople in Norway
Expatriate footballers in Norway